The Uncle from Peking (French: L'oncle de Pékin) is a 1934 French comedy film directed by Jacques Darmont and starring Armand Bernard, Janine Merrey and Pierre Brasseur.

The film's sets were designed by the art director Aimé Bazin.

Cast
 Georges Benoît 
 Armand Bernard as Antoine Robichon  
 Berthier as railway station manager
 Armand Bour as the notary
 Pierre Brasseur as Philippe  
 Germaine Charley as Yolande  
 Jean Dax as Edgar Pinson  
 Guy Derlan as a curator 
 Frédéric Mariotti as a curator 
 Claude May as Huguette  
 Janine Merrey as Suzy  
 Alexandre Mihalesco as the Chinese waiter
 Madame Milton as the castle guard
 André Numès Fils 
 Armand Pouget as the coachman 
 Monsieur Sablon as Barigoul  
 Pierre Thomas as a peasant 
 Georges Térof as Séraphin  
 Marcel Vidal as Pierre

References

Bibliography 
 Rège, Philippe. Encyclopedia of French Film Directors, Volume 1. Scarecrow Press, 2009.

External links 
 

1934 films
French comedy films
1934 comedy films
1930s French-language films
French black-and-white films
Films scored by Casimir Oberfeld
1930s French films